Kevin John Neville (born 24 March 1968) is an Australian former cricketer. Born on March 24, 1968 in Numurkah, Victoria, Australia, he scored his first century in district cricket while playing for Prahran Cricket Club against South Melbourne in 1989. In 1993 he was named to play for Victoria in a first-class cricket match against South Africa.

See also
 List of Victoria first-class cricketers

References

External links
 

1968 births
Living people
Australian cricketers
Victoria cricketers